SD Victoria is a worldwide support ship operated by Serco Marine Services in support of the United Kingdom's Naval Service, and currently the second largest ship operated by Serco Marine Services, after SD Northern River.

Her duties involve supporting training operations and transporting military personnel and equipment around the world. SD Victoria has also been photographed carrying Specialist Craft operated by the Special Boat Service.

On board, SD Victoria is equipped with several operations and briefing rooms.

See also
Naval Service (United Kingdom)
List of ships of Serco Marine Services

References

External links
Serco Marine SD Victoria (sercomarine.com)
"Vessel Tracking" (MarineTraffic.com)

Victoria
2010 ships